Colonie Center is a shopping mall located in Roessleville, New York, a suburb of Albany, at the intersection of Central Avenue, Wolf Road, and Interstate 87. Opening in 1966, it was the first enclosed shopping mall in New York's Capital Region. Colonie Center was owned by Feldman Mall Properties until 2009, when it was sold to Heitman Value Partners. In April 2013, Heitman sold the mall to KKR & Co. L.P., partnered with Colonie Pacific. 

Colonie Center's anchors are Boscov's, Christmas Tree Shops, Macy's, Regal Cinemas, and Whole Foods Market. L.L. Bean, Barnes and Noble, and H&M operate as junior anchors. Previous anchors include Steinbach and Sears. 

In 2015, Sears Holdings spun off 235 of its properties, including the Sears at Colonie Center, into Seritage Growth Properties. Portions of the former auto center became BJ's Restaurants and Ethan Allen. Sears closed on September 17, 2017 and remains vacant as of 2022.

On October 5, 2020, Cineworld announced it would close all Regal, Cineworld, and Picturehouse Cinemas locations in the US, UK, and Ireland indefinitely due to the COVID-19 pandemic, beginning October 8 and reopening April 23, 2021.

References

External links

Colonie Center Homepage
Albany-Colonie Chamber of Commerce History of Area Malls

Shopping malls in Albany County, New York
Colonie, New York
Shopping malls established in 1966